Diego Alejandro de Souza Carballo (born 14 May 1984 in Melo) is a Uruguayan footballer. He plays for El Tanque Sisley as a midfielder. He is nicknamed "Pepe" and "El ojo".

Club career
De Souza joined Defensor Sporting youth teams at the age of 16 and has since been claimed to be one of the greatest players in the history of the Uruguayan team. In 2009, he was chosen as the best player of the Uruguayan Primera División. In July 2010, Defensor Sporting received a US$1.5 million offer from Universidad de Chile which was accepted by the Uruguayan team but later turned down by de Souza's agent Gonzalo Madrid, who was hoping to place the midfielder in a European team. On 27 January 2011, Diego de Souza signed a contract with Banfield for four years.

International career
He has been called up to the Uruguay national team but as an unused sub.

Honours

Defensor Sporting

 Uruguayan League: 2007–08

References

External links

1984 births
Living people
People from Melo, Uruguay
Uruguayan people of Portuguese descent
Uruguayan footballers
Association football midfielders
Uruguayan Primera División players
Argentine Primera División players
Uruguayan Segunda División players
Defensor Sporting players
Club Atlético Banfield footballers
Montevideo Wanderers F.C. players
Cerro Largo F.C. players
C.S.D. Municipal players
El Tanque Sisley players
Central Español players
Uruguayan expatriate footballers
Expatriate footballers in Argentina